Dr Mei Ling Young (1949 - 20 January 2021) was a Malaysian Chinese social scientist, international development scholar and academic administrator. She was the Deputy Vice-Chancellor (i.e. Vice President) of the International Medical University, a university she co-founded in 1992. She was also the president of the Malaysian Association of Private Colleges and Universities since 2015.

She gained a BA in geography at the University of Auckland and a PhD in demography at the Australian National University. She was a lecturer in development studies at the University of Science, Malaysia. In 1981 she founded the Sesama Consulting Group, which focused on development planning and urban studies, particularly urbanisation in developing countries. Her interest in development issues led her to become a principal co-founder of the International Medical University (IMU) in Kuala Lumpur in 1992. She had served as the university's provost, as executive director of IMU Education, and as Company Director of IMU Health and IMU Healthcare.

Death 
Dr Young died in the morning of 20 January 2021. The announcement of her passing was made on the official website of International Medical University.

Works
Migrants and niches, 1982
Social forces, the state and the international division of labour: the case of Malaysia, 1987

Honours
Doctor of Science (honoris causa), University of Strathclyde, 2013
Doctor of Laws (honoris causa), University of Dundee, 2014
ASME Gold Medal, 2017

References

Living people
Academic staff of the International Medical University
University of Auckland alumni
Australian National University alumni
Malaysian people of Chinese descent
1949 births